Hasht Markh (also Romanized as Hasht Margh) is a village in Shah Jahan Rural District, in the Central District of Faruj County, North Khorasan Province, Iran. At the 2006 census, its population was 17, in 7 families.

References 

Populated places in Faruj County